Leon de Winter (born 24 February 1954) is a Dutch writer and columnist.

Early life 
Leon de Winter was born on 24 February 1954 in Den Bosch, in the southern Netherlands. He grew up in a Jewish orthodox family and attended City Grammar School in Den Bosch. After his graduation he attended the academy of Bavaria Film Studios in Munich and the Netherlands Film Academy in Amsterdam. However, the Film Academy was much criticised by De Winter and he left the Film Academy in 1978 without a degree.

Writing career 

After leaving the Film Academy, De Winter made some television series, like Junkieverdriet and De (ver)wording van de jonge Dürer. The latter, which was also rewritten into a novel, is the story of an unemployed young boy who does not know how to handle life, and who goes slowly but inevitably insane.

Until 1982 De Winter also wrote reviews for the weekly magazine Vrij Nederland.

His first successful novel was Zoeken naar Eileen W. (1981). A film version of this was made by Rudolf van den Berg. In 1981 De Winter also wrote Place de la Bastille.

In 1986 the novel Kaplan was published. The protagonist of this novel is a writer who is searching for the truth about birth, love and death.

In 1990 the novel Hoffman's honger was published.  Hoffman's honger is a literary thriller set in Prague.

Hoffman's honger was followed in 1991 by the novel Supertex. In 1992 the novel De ruimte van Sokolov was published. Just like Hoffman's honger, De ruimte van Sokolov is a literary thriller, this time set in Israel.

In 1995 De Winter wrote Zionoco, the story of a rabbi, who has lost his faith, and is searching for his Jewish roots. In the same year, his book Serenade was published as the "Boekenweekgeschenk".

De Winter's latest novels are De hemel van Hollywood, which was published in 1997, God's Gym, which was published in 2002, and Het recht op terugkeer, published in 2008.

Most of these works feature protagonists searching—in particular, for a Jewish identity. These attempts to bring order out of chaos are a result of discontent with seemingly empty and aimless lives.

De Winter became more involved in political writings in newspapers and magazines, and appearances on television, possibly the most recognizable of these being his many articles in support of Israel and his support for an "Islamic Enlightenment".

On 26 December 2007, de Winter announced a stop to his political writings on blogs and magazines and that he was considering a one-year sabbatical with his family to California. One year turned into three years and he moved back to the Netherlands and he started writing for Dutch and German newspapers again.

However, he continued publishing opinion articles in newspapers in the Netherlands, such as on the racism trial against Geert Wilders, criticisms of Barack Obama, the European Union, the Euro currency and financial aid for members of the Euro area. Since early 2020 de Winter supports Black Lives Matter

Personal life 
De Winter is married to Jessica Durlacher, who is also a writer. They have two children, Moos and Moon (Solomonica), and are currently living in Bloemendaal and Los Angeles.

Film directing
He directed three films, De Verwording van Herman Dürer, De grens, between 1979 and 1993. The film De grens was screened in the Un Certain Regard section at the 1984 Cannes Film Festival.

Film adaptations
Zoeken naar Eileen, directed by Rudolf van den Berg (1987, based on the novel Zoeken naar Eileen W.)
The Hollywood Sign, directed by Sönke Wortmann (2001, based on the novel De hemel van Hollywood)
SuperTex, directed by Jan Schütte (2003, based on the novel SuperTex)

Awards and honors

2002 Welt-Literaturpreis

References

External links 

 
 Der Spiegel interview with de Winter on the occasion of the publication of his novel The Right of Return 

1954 births
Living people
Dutch columnists
Dutch film producers
Dutch republicans
Jewish Dutch writers
People from 's-Hertogenbosch